Kim Longinotto ( Sally Anne Longinotto-Landseer; born 8 February 1948, London) is a British documentary film maker, well-known for making films that highlight the plight of female victims of oppression or discrimination. Longinotto has made more than 20 films, usually featuring inspiring women and girls at their core. Her subjects have included female genital mutilation in Kenya (The Day I Will Never Forget), women standing up to rapists in India (Pink Saris), and the story of Salma, an Indian Muslim woman who smuggled poetry out to the world while locked up by her family for decades.

Early life
Born Sally Anne Longinotto-Landseer to an Italian father and a Welsh mother on 8 February 1948; her father was a photographer who later went bankrupt. At the age of 10, she was sent to an all-girls boarding school, where she found it hard to make friends due to the mistress forbidding anyone to talk to her for a term after she became lost during a school trip. 

She discovered that her double-barreled "Landseer" surname was made-up so she dropped it and just kept Longinotto, adopting a new forename (Kim or Kimona). After a period of homelessness, she went to Essex University, where she studied English literature and writing. She later followed friend and future filmmaker Nick Broomfield to the National Film and Television School. 

While studying, she made Pride of Place, a documentary about her boarding school that was shown at the London Film Festival.

Career 
Longinotto is an observational filmmaker. Observational cinema, also known as direct cinema, free cinema or cinema verite, usually excludes certain documentary techniques such as advanced planning, scripting, staging, narration, lighting, re-enactment and interviewing.

She runs a production company, Vixen Films, which she founded in 1988 with Claire Hunt under the name Twentieth Century Vixen Productions.

Filmography
 Pride of Place (1976) – Director/Camera (as Kimona Landseer)
 Theatre Girls (1978) – Director/Cinematographer
 Cross and Passion (1981) - Director (with Claire Pollak)
 Underage (1982) – Director/Cinematographer
 Eat the Kimono (1989) – Director/Cinematographer
 Hidden Faces  (1990) – Director/Cinematographer
 The Good Wife of Tokyo (1992) – Director
 Dream Girls (1994) – Director/Cinematographer/Producer
 Shinjuku Boys (1995) – Director/Cinematographer/Producer
 Rock Wives (1996) (TV) – Director / Camera
 Divorce Iranian Style (1998) – Director / Camera
 Gaea Girls (2000) – Director/Cinematographer/Producer
 Runaway (2001) – Director/Cinematographer
 The Day I Will Never Forget (2002) – Director/Cinematographer
 Sisters in Law (2005) – Co-Director (with Florence Ayisi)/Cinematographer/Producer
 Hold Me Tight, Let Me Go (2007) – Director/Cinematographer/Producer
 Rough Aunties (2008) – Director/ Cinematographer
 Pink Saris (2010) – Director/Camera
  Salma (2013) – Director / Camera
  Love Is All (2014) – Director
 Dreamcatcher (2015)   –  Director/Camera
 Shooting the Mafia (2019)  Director/Camera/Cowriter

Awards
Shinjuku Boys (1995) was judged Outstanding Documentary at the San Francisco Gay and Lesbian Film Festival.
Divorce Iranian Style (1998) won the Grand Prize for Best Documentary San Francisco International Film Festival and the Silver Hugo Award at the Chicago International Film Festival.
Runaway (2001) received the Children Rights Award (Filmpreis für Kinderrechte) at the Unabhängiges Filmfest Osnabrück
The Day I Will Never Forget (2002) was awarded the Amnesty International DOEN Award at IDFA and Best Doc UK Spotlight at Hot Docs.
Sisters in Law (2005) won the Prix Art et Essai and Special Mention Europa Cinemas at the Cannes film festival in 2005.
Rough Aunties (2008) won the World Cinema Grand Jury Prize at the Sundance Film Festival and was in the official selection for Sheffield Doc/Fest 2009.
Pink Saris (2010) won the Special Jury Award at Sheffield Doc/Fest 2010, where Longinotto also won the Inspiration Award, a trophy given to a figure in the documentary world who has championed the medium.
Dreamcatchers (2015) received the Voice of a Woman (VOW) Award for Documentary

References

External links
Kim Longinotto at Women Make Movies
 
 Kim Longinotto on YouTube

1948 births
Living people
English people of Italian descent
English people of Welsh descent
English documentary filmmakers
English women film directors
English film directors
English women cinematographers
Alumni of the National Film and Television School
WFTV Award winners
Women documentary filmmakers